Bozkır Dam is a dam in Aksaray Province, Turkey. It was built between 1976 and 1980.

See also
List of dams and reservoirs in Turkey

References
DSI

Dams in Aksaray Province
Dams completed in 1980